Granberry is a surname. Notable people with the surname include:

C. Read Granberry (1899–1962), American teacher and civil servant
Edwin Granberry (1897–1988), American writer, novelist, and translator
George Caldwell Granberry, American politician, postmaster, and teacher

See also
 Granbery
 Grandberry (disambiguation)